Lillian Kemble (née Schmidt) (fl. 1900–1922) was an American stage and silent film actress. Born in Milwaukee, Wisconsin, to Karl (Carl) Schmidt, a German immigrant comedian and theatre manager, she made her first stage appearance at the age of 10, performing in German and English. She made her English-language debut at the Lyceum Theatre in Denver, and worked in several stock companies throughout the country. She made a name for herself on Broadway starring in George Broadhurst's 1906 original The Man of the Hour. She was leading lady for two seasons with the Castle Square Theatre company in Boston before joining the Poli Theatre Company in Washington, D.C.  She also appeared in silent films, including a chief supporting role in The House of Mirrors (1916) with Frank Mills.

In 1898 she married the actor-singer Will S. Rising. They divorced in 1905, and a year later Kemble was co-respondent in the divorce case of fellow actor Charles D. Mackay and Georgie Elliott Porter, daughter of novelist Linn Boyd Porter. Kemble and Mackay were married shortly afterwards.

Footnotes

References

External links

Lillian Kemble at the American Film Institute Catalog

American stage actresses
American silent film actresses
20th-century American actresses
Year of death missing
Date of death missing